Lambert of Auxerre was a medieval 13th century logician best known for writing the book "Summa Lamberti" or simply "Logica"  in the mid 1250s which became an authoritative textbook on logic in the Western tradition. He was a Dominican in the Dominican house at Auxerre. His contemporaries were Peter of Spain, William of Sherwood, and Roger Bacon.

Works and Translations
 Logica (Summa Lamberti), First edition of the Latin text by Franco Alessio, Firenze, La Nuova Italia, 1971.
 Logica, or Summa Lamberti, translated with notes and introduction by Thomas S. Maloney, Notre Dame University Press, 2015.
 Properties of Terms, in Norman Kretzmann, Eleonore Stump, trans., in Cambridge Translations of Medieval Philosophical Texts, Vol. 1: Logic and the Philosophy of Language, Cambridge: Cambridge University Press, 1988, pp. 102–162.
 Alain de Libera, Le traité De appellatione de Lambert de Lagny (Lambert d’Auxerre), Archives d’histoire doctrinale et littéraire du Moyen Age, 48, pp. 227–285, 1982.

Further reading
 L. M. de Rijk, On the genuine text of Peter of Spain’s Summule logicales, IV: The Lectura tractatuum by Guillelmus Arnaldi, master of arts at Toulouse (1235–1244). With a note on the date of Lambert of Auxerre’s Summule. Vivarium 7, 1969, pp. 120–162.
 A. de Libera, De la logique à la grammaire: remarques sur la théorie de la détermination chez Roger Bacon et Lambert d’Auxerre (Lambert de Lagny), In: Geoffrey L. Bursill-Hall, Sten Ebbesen and E.F.K. Koerner (eds.), De Ortu Grammaticae. Studies in Medieval Grammar and Linguistic Theory in Memory of Jan Pinborg, John Benjamin, Amsterdam/Philadelphia, 1990, pp. 209–226.

Notes

French logicians